Eunice Lake is a glacial lake located in Pierce County, Washington and in the northwest part of Mount Rainier National Park. The lake was named after Eunice Sargent Roth by her husband Andy (Adolph) Roth who grew up in Washogal and was active in the forest service for many years.  The lake is a popular area for hiking.

Gallery

See also
Mowich Lake
Tolmie Peak

References

External links
Tolmie Peak Lookout Trail

Lakes of Washington (state)
Lakes of Pierce County, Washington